The 2013 ACC Twenty20 Cup was a cricket tournament held between March 26 and April 3 in Nepal.  The tournament served as a qualifying tournament for the 2013 ICC World Twenty20 Qualifier. Afghanistan has already qualified as an ODI nation while UAE has already qualified as host for the 2013 ICC World Twenty20 Qualifier. Hence, the tournament will, in reality, serve as qualifier for other top two teams from Asian region.

Group stage

Group A

Fixtures

Group B

Fixtures

Semi-finals

3rd place play-off

Final

Statistics

Most runs
The top five highest run scorers (total runs) are included in this table.

Most wickets
The following table contains the five leading wicket-takers.

See also

2013 ICC World Twenty20 Qualifier
World Cricket League Africa Region

References

2014 ICC World Twenty20
ACC Twenty20 Cup
International cricket competitions in Nepal
ACC Twenty20 Cup
2013 in Nepalese sport